Chearoco, Chiaraco or Chiaroco (all possibly from Aymara ch'iyara black, juqhu muddy place) is a mountain in the Cordillera Real in the Andes of Bolivia. It is situated in the La Paz Department, Larecaja Province, Guanay Municipality, southeast of the peak of Aman Pata. Chearoco lies between Qalsata in the northwest and Chachakumani in the southeast.

The Aymara name of the mountain correlates with the names of the nearby area (Chiar Jokho) and the river Ch'iyar Juqhu (Chiar Jokho, Chiar Joko) which originates near the mountain.

First Ascent 
Chearoko was first climbed by Erwin Hein (Austria), Alfred Horeschowski, Hugo Hoertnagel and Hans Pfann (Germany) 25 June 1928.

Elevation 
Other data from available digital elevation models: ASTER 6078 metres and TanDEM-X 6106 metres. The height of the nearest key col is 5049 meters, leading to a topographic prominence of 1055 meters. Chearoko is considered a Mountain Massif according to the Dominance System  and its dominance is 17.28%. Its parent peak is Ancohuma and the Topographic isolation is 18.4 kilometers.

See also
List of mountains in the Andes

References 

Mountains of La Paz Department (Bolivia)
Glaciers of Bolivia
Six-thousanders of the Andes
Mountains of Bolivia